Drzewiecki (feminine: Drzewiecka; plural: Drzewieccy) is a Polish surname. It may refer to:
 Andy Drzewiecki (born 1947), English weightlifter
 Gary Drzewiecki (born 1954), American businessman and politician
 Jerzy Drzewiecki (1902–1990), Polish aeroplane constructor
 Karol Drzewiecki (born 1995), Polish tennis player
 Mirosław Drzewiecki (born 1956), Polish politician
 Piotr Drzewiecki (1865–1943), Polish politician
 Ron Drzewiecki (1933–2015), American football player
 Stanisław Drzewiecki (born 1987), Polish pianist
 Stefan Drzewiecki (1844–1938), Polish scientist
 Zbigniew Drzewiecki (1890–1971), Polish pianist

See also
 

Polish-language surnames